The Dachaoshan Dam is a gravity dam on the Lancang (Mekong) River in Yunnan Province, China. The sole purpose of the dam is hydroelectric power production as it supplies water to a power station containing six 225 MW generators for a total installed capacity of 1,350 MW.

Background
Initial construction preparations on the dam began in 1993 before it was approved ready for construction in 1994. On August 4, 1997, the project was approved for construction commencement and on November 10, 1997, the river was diverted. Between 2001 and 2003, the dam was complete and all six generators went operational.

Design
To release water downstream, the dam has five  x  crest openings along with three mid-level openings and one bottom flushing outlet.

See also 

 List of power stations in China

References

Hydroelectric power stations in Yunnan
Dams in China
Dams in the Mekong River Basin
Gravity dams
Dams completed in 2003
Roller-compacted concrete dams
Buildings and structures in Lincang
Buildings and structures in Pu'er